The Chile men's national water polo team is the representative for Chile in international men's water polo.

Results

Olympic Games
1948 — 17th place

References

Water polo
Men's national water polo teams
National water polo teams in South America
National water polo teams by country
 
Men's sport in Chile